Diocese of Leal or Bishopric of Estonia was the name of the main Latin diocese in Estonia during the early Catholic missionary phase.

History 
It was established in 1211, with episcopal see in Leal (today Lihula). The two known bishops were Fulco and Theoderich.
 
It was suppressed in 1235, to establish on its territory the Roman Catholic Diocese of Dorpat (Tartu), which was itself suppressed in 1558, without succession.

Source 
 GigaCatholic

Medieval Estonia
Former Roman Catholic dioceses in Europe
Leal
History of Christianity in Estonia